Travis Grantham is an American politician and a Republican member of the Arizona House of Representatives elected to represent District 14 in 2022. He previously represented District 12 from 2017 to 2023. Grantham was also a 2012 Republican candidate who sought election to the U.S. House of Representatives to represent the 9th congressional district of Arizona.

Elections
In 2012, Grantham ran for the U.S. House in the newly drawn 9th district. He was defeated by Vernon Parker in the 7-way Republican primary, receiving 18.4% of the vote and coming in 3rd.

In 2016, Grantham and incumbent Eddie Farnsworth defeated LaCinda Lewis in the Republican primary for Arizona's 12th legislative district. They were unopposed in the general election.

Legislative activity
In 2018 Grantham sponsored a proposed state constitutional amendment which would have allowed the legislature to place candidates for the US Senate on the ballot. Also in 2018 he opposed the extension of a sales tax used to support education saying, "We're not addressing what I believe to be one of the main issues of the bill - which is hey, there's these buckets in the bill that money is dropped into them and the schools have to spend the money as the bill's written." In 2021 he served as speaker pro tempore of the House. In April 2021, he made news after referring "colored people" and demanding that a black legislator be "sat down" during a debate about a voting rights bill.

Background and personal information
Grantham received a bachelor's degree in agribusiness from Arizona State University. He is a current Lieutenant Colonel in the Arizona Air National Guard.

References

External links
 Biography at Ballotpedia

1979 births
21st-century American politicians
Living people
Republican Party members of the Arizona House of Representatives